Richard Wayne Snell (May 21, 1930 – April 19, 1995) was an American white supremacist convicted of killing of two people in Arkansas between November 3, 1983 and June 30, 1984. Snell was sentenced to death for one of the murders, and executed by lethal injection in 1995.

Background 
Richard Snell was a member of the white supremacist group The Covenant, The Sword, and the Arm of the Lord (known as the CSA), which was started in 1971 in the small community of Elijah, Missouri, by polygamist James Ellison. He was also a believer in the Christian Identity religion, and frequented Elohim City, a private community located in Oklahoma. The Bureau of Alcohol, Tobacco, Firearms and Explosives (ATF) had ongoing investigations into the organization. By the end of their operations, the ATF obtained 155 Krugerrands (gold coins), one live light antitank rocket (LAW), 94 long guns, 30 handguns, 35 sawed-off shotguns and machine guns, one light machine gun (a Japanese copy of the World War I Lewis, in .303 caliber), and three and a half bars of C-4 explosives. Much of this arsenal had been stolen.

Snell was involved in the filming of planes that landed at Mena Intermountain Municipal Airport in Mena, Arkansas, thought of by Snell and many conspiracy theorists to be used in a government-sanctioned operation of the Central Intelligence Agency (CIA) to smuggle drugs into the United States. Snell had claimed that law enforcement agencies, both state and those local to that area of western Arkansas, were involved in the cover-up of the Mena airport drug smuggling. He had also made claims that he had filmed the then-Governor of Arkansas, Bill Clinton, at Mena Intermountain Municipal Airport, but that claim has never been proven. Snell further claimed that one of the Arkansas state troopers assigned to Clinton's security team at that time had beaten Snell's wife in an attempt to force her to reveal the location of the alleged video footage Snell had taken at the airport.

In 1983, Snell, accompanied by CSA members William Thomas and Steven Scott, attempted to dynamite a natural gas pipeline near Fulton, Arkansas, unsuccessfully. Scott was eventually captured and convicted of that crime, while several other CSA members were arrested on various other charges, mostly weapons violations. By 1985, the CSA had essentially fallen into inactivity due to most of its members having been either killed or incarcerated.

Murders and execution 
Snell, known to his friends as "Wayne", was an anomaly amongst the militants of the CSA, in that he operated autonomously, using the CSA compound as his base of operation. Stephen Scott, a frequent collaborator with Snell, gave this information in a federal prison holding cell to one of the then members.

On November 3, 1983, Snell, accompanied by Thomas and Scott, shot and killed pawn shop owner William Stumpp, who he mistakenly believed was of Jewish descent, in Arkansas. Thomas waited outside while Scott followed Snell inside.

On June 30, 1984, Snell killed black Arkansas State Trooper Louis P. Bryant near DeQueen, Arkansas. Snell then left the scene and drove across the Oklahoma state line. A truck driver who witnessed the killing of Officer Bryant followed him and contacted the Broken Bow police department. The police officers there set up a roadblock, where they engaged Snell in a shootout that resulted in Snell being wounded six times in the abdomen, knee, and ankle, and arrested. Snell was then returned to Arkansas for trial, where he was convicted of murder and sentenced to life in prison for the murder of Bryant and death for the murder of Stumpp. Snell never denied the allegations made against him, or the crimes he was accused of having committed.

In exchange for testimony against Snell, Thomas was allowed to plead guilty to a federal racketeering charge. He was sentenced to 12 years in prison, to run concurrently to other sentences imposed by Missouri and federal courts. Scott pleaded guilty to a non-capital charge of first degree murder.

Snell was held at the Tucker Maximum Security Unit until April 15, 1995, when he was transferred to the execution site. Snell's death sentence was carried out on April 19, 1995, at the Cummins Unit in Lincoln County, Arkansas.

Oklahoma City bombing 
He was executed on the same day that Timothy McVeigh carried out the Oklahoma City bombing, which destroyed the Alfred P. Murrah Federal Building. Snell had been accused of plotting to bomb the Murrah Building in 1983. Snell abandoned his plan after the rocket launcher he'd been practicing with exploded in his hands. He took this as a sign that God didn't want him to go ahead with the plan. Snell had repeatedly predicted there would be a bombing on the day of his execution.

Snell watched televised reports of the Oklahoma City bombing on the day of his execution. Reports of his reaction varied, and Snell was either appalled at what he saw or was "smiling and chuckling and nodding." One theory holds that Timothy McVeigh committed his bombing in retaliation for Snell's execution. McVeigh, however, said that his primary motivation for the bombing was retaliation against the government for its Waco Siege that took place exactly two years prior on April 19, 1993 and the government's handling of the Ruby Ridge crisis. McVeigh never testified as to why he chose the Murrah Federal Building in Oklahoma City.

In his last words before being executed, Snell addressed then-Governor Jim Guy Tucker:

See also 

 Capital punishment in Arkansas
 List of people executed in Arkansas

References

Further reading

1930 births
1995 deaths
1984 murders in the United States
20th-century executions by Arkansas
20th-century executions of American people
Antisemitic attacks and incidents in the United States
Racially motivated violence against African Americans
Oklahoma City bombing
American conspiracy theorists
American white supremacists
American people convicted of murdering police officers
American people executed for murder
Executed people from Oklahoma
People convicted of murder by Arkansas
People executed by Arkansas by lethal injection